The Klaipeda Chamber Orchestra is one of the brightest and the most dynamic among professional chamber orchestras in the Baltic Sea region. It was founded in 1992 by violist Liuda Kuraitienė, who remained orchestra's artistic director. In June 2009, she was succeeded by cellist Mindaugas Bačkus. The orchestra's repertoire is very extensive and diverse. From baroque music to contemporary works (many were performed for the first time).

Orchestra tour takes place in many European countries and concert halls such as Berlin Philharmonie, L'Auditori (Barcelona), Mariinsky Theatre Concert Hall (St.Petersburg), Tonhalle (Zürich), and others. Klaipėda Chamber orchestra has appeared with artists like as David Geringas, Giovanni Sollima, Enrico Onofri, Valeriy Sokolov, Reinhard Goebel, Lukas Geniušas, Mirga Gražinytė-Tyla, Nikita Borisoglebsky, Dmitry Sinkovskiy, Paul Badura-Skoda, Bruno Cocset, Jean-Marc Luisada and others. 

The orchestra participates in educational programs and festivals such as Klaipėda International Violoncello Academy and Klaipeda Jazz Festival. In 2018, The Klaipeda Chamber Orchestra performed at Europe's largest jazz festival in Montreux (Switzerland).

References

Musical groups established in 1992
Chamber orchestras
Lithuanian orchestras
Music in Klaipėda
1992 establishments in Lithuania